This is a list of official and unofficial names for time spans in the geologic timescale and units of chronostratigraphy. Since many of the smallest subdivisions of the geologic timescale were in the past defined on regional lithostratigraphic units, there are many alternative names that overlap. The body concerned with standardizing the names of geochronologic units is the International Commission on Stratigraphy (ICS). In 2008 however, even though the Phanerozoic eon is almost completely divided into internationally recognizable units, local subdivisions are often still preferred over the international ones.

List

See also

 Astronomical chronology
 Age of the Earth
 Age of the universe
 Chronological dating, archaeological chronology
 Absolute dating
 Relative dating
 Phase (archaeology)
 Archaeological association
 Geochronology
 Chronostratigraphy
 Future of the Earth
 Geologic time scale
 Geological history of Earth
 Plate reconstruction
 Plate tectonics
 Thermochronology
 Timeline of natural history
 General
 Consilience, evidence from independent, unrelated sources can "converge" on strong conclusions

References

Literature
; 1975: The type Wenlock series, Report of the Institute of Geological Sciences, 75(13), pp. 1–19.
; 1971: A correlation of Silurian rocks in the British Isles, Journal of the Geological Society 127(2), pp. 103–136.
; 2004: A Geologic Time Scale 2004, Cambridge University Press, Cambridge, .
; 2004: U-Pb zircon date from the Neoproterozoic Ghaub Formation, Namibia: Constraints on Marinoan glaciation, Geology 32(9), pp. 817–820.
; 1980: Ludlow stages, Lethaia 13, p. 268, .
; 2005: Global time scale and regional stratigraphic reference scales of Central and West Europe, East Europe, Tethys, South China, and North America as used in the Devonian–Carboniferous–Permian Correlation Chart 2003 (DCP 2003), Palaeogeography, Palaeoclimatology, Palaeoecology 240, pp. 318–372.
; 1998: The Gelasian Stage (Upper Pliocene): a new unit of the global standard chronostratigraphic scale, Episodes 21(2), pp. 82–87.

Names
Geochronologic names
Geologic time scales of Earth
Geochronologic names